Living Planet may refer to:
 The Living Planet, 1984 BBC nature documentary series
 The Living Planet: Music from the BBC TV Series
 Living Planet Index, an indicator of biological diversity by the World Wide Fund for Nature and the Zoological Society of London
 Living Planet Report, a report published by the World Wide Fund for Nature
 Living Planet Programme,  a programme within the European Space Agency